The discography of the Scottish art rock/new wave band Simple Minds consists of 21 studio albums (either original or covers and counting 1981's Sons and Fascination/Sister Feelings Call as a double album release), eleven live albums, ten compilation albums, fourteen box sets, 68 singles, and five video albums.

Albums

Studio albums

Live albums

Compilation albums

Box sets

Website releases

EPs

Singles

1970s–1980s

1990s

2000s–present

Promotional singles

Videos

Video albums

Music videos

Notes

References

Discographies of British artists
Pop music group discographies
Rock music group discographies
New wave discographies